Sylt may refer to:

Places
 Sylt, an island in the district of Nordfriesland, in Schleswig-Holstein, Germany
 Sylt (municipality), a municipality on the island of Sylt in Germany
 Sylt-Ost, a former municipality on the island of Sylt in Germany
 Landschaft Sylt, an Amt ("collective municipality") in the district of Nordfriesland, in Schleswig-Holstein, Germany
 Sylt Airport, in Westerland, the capital of the island of Sylt in Germany
Lager Sylt, a Nazi concentration camp on the island of Alderney during the occupation of the Channel Islands during World War II

Businesses
 Sylt Air, an airline based in Germany that operates flights to the island of Sylt

Ships
 , a Kriegsmarine tanker
 , a German merchant (and later Kriegsmarine) coaster